The order's constitution permits the appointment of five honorary members of the Order of Canada per year. The following is a list of all honorary appointments to date; those rendered in italics were later made Canadian citizens and thus no longer regarded as honorary inductees.

Notes

References